La Cure is a village located some  northwest of Lake Geneva, straddling the Franco-Swiss border. Administratively, the Swiss half of La Cure is part of the municipality of Saint-Cergue, while the French half is part of the municipality of Les Rousses. The international border bisects at least four buildings, notably the Hotel Arbez, in which the dining hall and other rooms are bisected by the border.

History
Until 1862, La Cure was entirely in France.  France and Switzerland had previously disputed possession of the strategically important Vallée des Dappes, which was controlled by the latter until in 1862, the Swiss accepted an offer to exchange that territory for another piece just to the north and east; the new boundary was drawn directly through La Cure.  According to the Treaty of Dappes, which formalized the swap, any buildings existing at the time that the new line was demarcated were not to be disturbed, even if the boundary bisected them.

Today, the border passes through the Hotel Arbez (see below); in addition, it bisects at least two residences, and a pub.

Railway
There is a Swiss Railways narrow gauge railway line, the Nyon–St-Cergue–Morez Railway, that runs from Nyon to La Cure.

Hotel Arbez

Taking advantage of the delay between negotiation of the treaty and its final ratification by the Swiss Parliament, a local businessman named Ponthus constructed a new structure in 1863 on the new borderline.  Originally Ponthus operated a grocery store in the Swiss section of the building, with a bar in the French section, hoping to turn the cross-border business to his advantage. In 1921, Jules-Jean Arbez purchased the building, and turned it into a hotel.

Today, the Franco-Swiss border passes through the kitchen, dining room, hallway and several rooms of the hotel.  In two rooms (including the honeymoon suite) the beds themselves are bisected by the boundary, while in another, the bathroom is in France, while the rest of the room is in Switzerland.

During the German occupation of France in World War II, their troops were allowed to enter the French side of the hotel, but were strictly prohibited from crossing to the Swiss side.  Since the stairway to the upper floor started in French territory but ended in Switzerland, the Germans were not permitted to access any of the upper rooms, which became a refuge for refugees and French Resistance members.  The hotel was chosen in 1962 for negotiation of the Évian Accords between France and Algeria, which resulted in the independence of the latter.

See also
Haskell Free Library and Opera House, a library located half in Derby Line, Vermont, United States and half in Stanstead, Quebec, Canada.

References

External links
Hotel Arbez.  Website for the hotel; primarily in French, with limited English translation.
La Cure: Photos and Maps.  Offers several large photos of the village and its buildings (with lines showing the border's location), as well as maps of the area.
Hotel Arbez: Half in France and Half in Switzerland.  Offers photos of the interior and exterior of the Hotel Arbez, with lines showing the precise location of the border in each.

Villages in the canton of Vaud
France–Switzerland border
France–Switzerland border crossings
Les Rousses
Divided cities